Mohamed Bangoura may refer to:

Mohamed Bangoura (musician), Guinean drummer
Mohamed Bangoura (footballer) (born 1996), Guinea footballer

See also
Mohamed Bangura (disambiguation)